Terje Wik Mikkelsen (born April 6, 1957 in Drøbak, south of Oslo) is an acknowledged Norwegian conductor with his main career in Europe and Asia.

He graduated from the Norwegian Academy of Music, and later studied orchestral conducting with Professor Jorma Panula at Sibelius Academy in Helsinki where he got his diploma.  From 1984 to 1991 he studied with Mariss Jansons in Oslo and St. Petersburg. In 2001 he was appointed Visiting Professor with the college of music of the Mahidol University in Bangkok.

Musical posts 

 Ukrainian State Symphony Orchestra, Chief Conductor (1993-1994) 
 Lithuanian State Symphony Orchestra, Principal Guest Conductor (1989-1993)
 Latvian National Symphony Orchestra, Chief Conductor (1997-2001), Principal Guest Conductor (2001–05)
 Thuringen Philharmonie Gotha-Suhl, GDM and Chief Conductor (1999-2003)
 Shanghai Symphony Orchestra, Principal Conductor (2006-2009)
 Tchaikovsky Symphony Orchestra Moscow Radio, Principal Guest Conductor (2009-2012)

Tours 

Terje Mikkelsen regularly appears with the Moscow Radio Orchestra, has given a number of concerts with orchestras such as St. Petersburg Philharmonic, Warszaw Philharmonic, Cologne Radio Orchestra (WDR), Hamburg Radio Orchestra (NDR), Rotterdam Philharmonic Orchestra, Belgian Radio Orchestra, BBC Welsh Symphony Orchestra, BBC Concert Orchestra, China National Symphony Orchestra, Vietnam National Symphony Orchestra, Thailand Philharmonic Orchestra, Munich Radio Orchestra and the Philharmonia Hungarica. He has conducted a large number of tours with both his regular- and other orchestras. With the Tchaikovsky Symphony Orchestra, he conducted two concerts in the Disney Hall, Los Angeles in 2008, and in 2010 fifteen concerts in England and two at the Festival of North Norway. In Spain he has conducted more than 100 concerts with Thuringen Philharmonie, Latvian National Symphony Orchestra, Shanghai Symphony Orchestra, Jena Philharmonic Orchestra, Munich Radio Orchestra, Academy of St. Martin in the Fields, Ukrainian State Symphony Orchestra and Norrlandsoperan (Sweden). With the Czech National Orchestra, he visited Great Britain in 2011 and with the Russian State Symphony Orchestra (Yevgeny Svetlanov's former orchestra), South America in 2015. He has also made a number of productions towards jazz, rock, film and light music for radio and TV. With Keith Emerson, the guitarist Marc Bonilla and the BBC Concert Orchestra he conducted a performance of Three Fates Project in Barciban Hall, London, in July 2015.

Discography

A selection of Mikkelsen's 50 CD-recordings 

 A complete series of orchestral works by Edvard Grieg (Lithuanian State Symphony Orchestra).
 Edvard Grieg; Peer Gynt Suite 1 & 2 -  Johan Svendsen: Romance for Violin and Orchestra. (Shanghai Symphony Orchestra)
 3 CDs with music by Johan Svendsen (Latvian National Symphony Orchestra)
 Finn Mortensen’s Symphony and other orchestral works (Munich Radio Orchestra)
 Carl Nielsen: Violin Concerto (Henrik Hannisdal, violin - Norwegian Radio Orchestra). 
 Peter Tsjaikovskij; Symfoni No  5 in E Minor, Op. 64 (Ukrainian State Symphony Orchestra)
 Adrien Francois Serais: Souvenir de Spa  (Wen-Sinn Yang, cello - Munich Radio Orchestra)

World premiere recordings 

 Johan Halvorsen: Complete stage music. (Latvian National Symphony Orchestra).
 Thomas Tellefsen: Piano Concertos. (Einar Steen-Nøkleberg, piano - Trondheim Symphony Orchestra) - nominated to the Norwegian Grammy Award 2005.
 Ole Olsen: Symfoni, Aasgaardsreien, Suite for String Orchestra (Latvian National Symphony Orchestra) 
 Eyvind Alnæs: Symphony Nos 1 and 2 (Latvian National Symphony Orchestra)
 Keith Emerson / Marc Bonilla: Three Fates Project (Munich Radio Orchestra)
 Carl Davidoff: Cello Concerto No 1 & 2 (Wen-Sinn Yang, cello - Latvian National Symphony Orchestra)
 Carl Davidoff: Cello Concerto No 3 & 4 (Wen-Sinn Yang, cello - Shanghai Symphony Orchestra)
 Romualds Kalsons: Concertos for Violin, and Cello, Symphonic Variations. (Valdis Zarigs, violin - Agnese Rugevica, cello - Latvian National Symphony Orchestra)
 Havana - Rio - Moscow (Stein Erik Olsen, guitar - Academy of St. Martin-in-the Fields)

References

Norwegian musicians
1957 births
Living people
People from Frogn